The women's tournament of football at the 2013 Summer Universiade was held from 5 to 16 July in Kazan, Russia.

Preliminary round

Group A

Group B

Group C

Classification rounds

9th–12th place

Semifinal round

5th–8th place

7th-place game

5th-place game

Final round

Quarterfinals

Semifinals

Bronze-medal match

Gold-medal match

Final standings

References

2013
Women
2013 in Russian women's sport
2013 in women's association football
International women's association football competitions hosted by Russia